Marica may refer to:

 Marica (mythology), a nymph in Roman mythology
 Maricá, Rio de Janeiro, Brazil
 Maritsa, a river in Bulgaria, alternatively spelled Marica
 Marica, a former brush-footed butterfly genus now included in Erebia

People
 Maricá (born 1979), Brazilian footballer who played among others for AEK
 Ciprian Marica (born 1985), Romanian footballer
 Marica Bodrožić (born 1973), German writer of Croatian descent
 Marica Hase (born 1981), Japanese gravure model and actress
 Marica Malović-Đukić (born 1949), Serbian historian
 Marica Stražmešter (born 1981), Serbian Olympic swimmer

See also
 Marika, name
 Maritsa (disambiguation)